Hindko (romanized:) is a cover term for a diverse group of Lahnda dialects spoken by several million people of various ethnic backgrounds in several areas in northwestern Pakistan, primarily in the provinces of Khyber Pakhtunkhwa and northwestern regions of Punjab.

There is a nascent language movement, and in recent decades Hindko-speaking intellectuals have started promoting the view of Hindko as a separate language. There is a literary tradition based on Peshawari, the urban variety of Peshawar in the northwest, and another one based on the language of Abbottabad in the northeast. In the 2017 census of Pakistan,  million people declared their language to be Hindko, while a 2020 estimate placed the number of speakers at 7 million.

Hindko to some extent is mutually intelligible with Punjabi and Saraiki, and has more affinities with the latter than with the former. Differences with other Punjabi varieties are more pronounced in the morphology and phonology than in the syntax.

The word Hindko, commonly used to refer to a number of Indo-Aryan dialects spoken in the neighbourhood of Pashto, likely originally meant "the Indian language" (in contrast to Pashto). An alternative local name for this language group is Hindki. A speaker of Hindko may be referred to as Hindki, Hindkun, or Hindkowan (Hindkuwan).

Like other Lahnda varieties, Hindko is derived from the Shauraseni Prakrit.

Geographic distribution and dialects
Varieties of Hindko are primarily spoken in a core area in the district of Attock in the northwestern corner of the province of Punjab, and in two neighbouring regions: in Peshawar to the north-west, and Hazara to the north-east, both in the province of Khyber Pakhtunkhwa (formerly known as the North-West Frontier Province). The Hindko of Hazara also extends east into nearby regions of Kashmir.

The central dialect group comprises Kohati (spoken in the city of Kohat and a few neighbouring villages in Khyber Pakhtunkhwa) and the three closely related dialects of Attock District, Punjab: Chacchi (spoken in Attock and Haripur Tehsils), Ghebi (spoken to the south in Pindi Gheb Tehsil) and Awankari (spoken in Talagang Tehsil, now part of Chakwal District). Rensch's classification based on lexical similarity also assigns to this group the rural dialects of Peshawar District. Shackle, however, sees most of them as closely related to the urban variety of Peshawar City.

In a group of its own is Peshawari, the prestigious urban variety spoken in the city of Peshawar and the one that is promoted as a standardised literary language. It has a wide dialectal base and has undergone the influence of Urdu and Standard Punjabi.

A separate group is formed in the northeast by the relatively homogeneous dialects of the Hazara region, which are collectively known as Hazara Hindko or Northern Hindko, with the variety spoken in Kaghan Valley known as Kaghani, and the variety of Tanawal known variously as Tanoli Hindko, Tanoli or Tinauli.
Hindko is also spoken further east into Kashmir. It is the predominant language of the Neelum Valley, in the north of Pakistan-administered Azad Kashmir, where it is locally known as Parmi (or Pārim; the name likely originated in the Kashmiri word  'from the other side', which was the term used by the Kashmiris of the Vale of Kashmir to refer to the highlanders, who spoke this language). This variety is also spoken across the Line of Control into Indian-administered Jammu and Kashmir.

The whole dialect continuum of Hindko is partitioned by Ethnologue into two languages: Northern Hindko (ISO 639-3 code: hno) for the dialects of Hazara, and Southern Hindko (ISO 639-3: hnd) for the remaining varieties. This grouping finds support in the results of the intelligibility testing done by Rensch, which also found out that the southern dialects are more widely understood throughout the Hindko area than are the northern ones.

Hindko dialects gradually transition into other varieties of Lahnda and Punjabi to the south. For example, to the southwest across the Salt Range are found dialects of Saraiki, and at least one of these – the one spoken in the Dera Ismail Khan District – is sometimes also referred to as "Hindko". To the southeast, Hindko is in a dialect continuum with Pahari–Pothwari, with the Galyat region of Abbottabad district and the area of Muzaffarabad in Azad Kashmir approximately falling on the boundary between the two.

There are Hindko diasporas in major urban centres like Karachi, as well as in some neighbouring countries. Some Hindu Hindkowans and Sikh Hindowans migrated to India after the partition of India in 1947. These Hindko speakers in India identify with the broader Punjabi community. There is also a small diaspora in Afghanistan, which includes members of the Hindu and Sikh community who became established there during the Sikh Empire in the first half of the 19th century. Most of them have emigrated since the rise of the Taliban, and the total population of Sikhs, Hindko-speaking or not, is estimated at around 300 families (as of 2018).

Social setting
There is no generic name for the speakers of Hindko because they belong to diverse ethnic groups and tend to identify themselves by the larger families or castes. However, the Hindko-speaking community belonging to the Hazara Division of Khyber Pakhtunkhwa are sometimes recognised collectively as Hazarewal. A large number of Hindko speakers in the Hazara Division are Pashtuns. Some of those speak Hindko as their mother tongue while others as a second language. These include the Tahirkhelis, Swatis, Yusufzais, Jadoons and Tareens. The other Hindko speakers include the Sayyids, Awans, Mughals, Tanolis, Turks, Qureshis and Gujjars.

The most common second language for Hindko-speakers in Pakistan is Urdu and the second most common one is Pashto. In most Hindko-speaking areas, speakers of Pashto live in the same or neighbouring communities (although this is less true in Abbottabad and Kaghan Valley). The relationship between Hindko and its neighbours is not one of stable bilingualism. In terms of domains of use and number of speakers, Hindko is dominant and growing in the north-east; in Hazara for example, it is displacing Pashto as the language in use among the Swati Pathans, and in the Neelam Valley of Azad Jammu & Kashmir it is gaining ground at the expense of the minority languages like Kashmiri. In the cities of Kohat and Peshawar, on the other hand, it is Hindko that is in a weaker position. With the exodus of the Hindko-speaking Hindus and Sikhs after Partitition and the consequent influx of Pashtuns into the vacated areas of the urban economy, there have been signs of a shift towards Pashto.

Phonology

Consonants 

Hindko contrasts stop consonants at the labial, alveolar, retroflex, palatal and velar places of articulation. The palatals have been described as pure stops (/ /) in Awankari, but as affricates in the varieties of Hazara. For the stop consonants of most varieties of Hindko there is a three-way contrast between voiced, voiceless and aspirated. Awankari, Kohati, and the varieties of Neelum Valley of Kashmir also distinguish voiced aspirated stops. The disappearance of the voiced aspirates from most Hindko varieties has been linked to the development of tone (see below).

Some documented instances include:
before other consonants in Kohati ( 'saying' versus  'said'),
in the middle or end of words in Peshawari ( 'swallow (verb)'),
word-medially after stressed vowels in Abbottabad Hindko ( 'to look'),
at the ends of words after vowels in the Hindko of Kashmir ( 'write').
Generally, the fricatives can be found in all positions: at the start, the middle, or at the end of the word (Tanoli Hindko:  'spoilt',  'small stick',  'branch'), with relatively few exceptions (one being the restriction on word-final  in the Hindko of Kashmir). The labio-dental has been explicitly described as the fricative  for the Hindko of Kashmir, and Tanawal, but as the approximant // in Awankari.

The retroflex nasal is overall shorter than the other nasals, and at least for the Hindko of Abbottabad it has been described as a nasalised flap: . For the Hindko of Kashmir it has been asserted to be an allophone of the alveolar nasal , but it is phonemic in Awankari and Tanoli; in both dialects it can occur in the middle and at the end of a word, as illustrated by the following examples from Tanoli:  'straight',  'pride'. The velar nasal  is phonemic in Tanoli:  'prayer call',  'fiancée', and in the Hindko of Kashmir, and in both cases it is found only in the middle or at the end of the word. In the main subdialect of Awankari, the velar nasal is only found before velar stops, and similarly, it is not among the phonemes identified for the Hindko of Abbottabad.

Hindko varieties have a single lateral consonant: the alveolar , unlike Punjabi, which additionally has a retroflex lateral . The Awankari dialect, as spoken by Muslims (and not Hindus) and described by Bahri in the 1930s, has a distinctive retroflex lateral, which, however, appears to be in complementary distribution with the alveolar lateral. There are two rhotic sounds in Hindko: an alveolar trill  (with a varying number of vibrations dependent on the phonetic context), and a retroflex flap .
The retoflex nasal , for at least some of the dialects that have it, is realised as a nasalised retroflex flap .

Vowels 

The vowels can be illustrated with the following examples from Tanoli:  'big stone',  'pain',  'yesterday',  'button',  'what',  'piece of meat',  'Sunday',  'thief',  'filth'.
Length is strongly contrastive and the long vowels are generally twice as long as the corresponding short vowels.
The Awankari dialect distinguishes between open and close "o" ( 'soft' vs.  'shoe').

Varieties of Hindko also possess a number of diphthongs (like ). Which of the many (typically around a dozen) overt vowel combinations should be seen as representing an underlying single segment (a diphthong) rather than simply a sequence of two separate underlying vowels, has varied with the analysis used and the dialect studied.

Nasalised vowels 
Hindko dialects possess phonemic nasal vowels (here marked with a tilde above the vowel). For example, in the Hindko of Azad Kashmir  'animal disease' contrasts with  'arm', and  'meat cutters' with  'hindrances'. In this variety of Hindko, as well as in the Hindko of Tanawal, there are nasal counterparts for all, or almost all, of the long vowels, but none for the short vowels. In Awankari and the Hindko of Abbottabad, on the other hand, there is contrastive nasalisation for short vowels as well:  'make one play' contrasts with  'scatter' (in Awankari),  'mixing' contrasts with  'knot').
Peshawari and Kohati presumably follow the pattern of Awankari but have historically lost nasalisation from the round vowels (like  or ) at the end of the word.

Additionally, vowels get nasalised allophonically when adjacent to a nasal consonant. In the varieties of Tanawal and Kashmir both long and short vowels can be nasalised in this way, but only if they precede the nasal consonant:  'washing',  'crying'. In the Hindko of Abbottabad, a vowel at the end of some words can be nasalised if it follows a nasal consonant. In the Awankari dialect, vowels can be allophonically nasalised both before and after a nasal consonant, but in either case the effect will depend on the position of stress (see  for more details).

Tone 
Unlike many Indo-Aryan languages, but in common with Punjabi, Hindko varieties have a system of pitch accent, which is commonly referred to as tone. In Punjabi, pitch accent has historically arisen out of the loss of voiced aspirates (. Thus in Standard Punjabi, if a voiced aspirate preceded the stressed vowel, it would lose its aspiration and cause the appearance of a high tone on that vowel:  >  'tongue'. If it followed the stressed vowel, then it would lead to a high tone and lose its aspiration and, if word-initial, its voicing:  >  'horse'. The same pattern has been reported for Hazara Hindko, with a low rising tone after historically voiced aspirates ( 'horse' < ), a high falling tone before historic voiced aspirates ( 'leper' <  ), and level tone elsewhere ( 'bitter'). According to preliminary observations on the Hazara Hindko variety of Abbottabad, the low tone is less prominent than in Punjabi, and a trace of the aspiration is preserved: for example 'horse' would be .

The variety spoken to the north-east, in Neelam Valley, has preserved voiced aspirates at the start of the word, so presumably the low tone is not established there. However, there are observations of its appearance in the speech of the residents of the main villages along the highway, likely under the influence of Punjabi and Hazara Hindko, and it has similarly been reported in the villages on the Indian side.

The southern Hindko varieties have similarly developed tone, but only when the voiced aspirate followed the stressed vowel; voiced aspirates preceding the stress have remained unchanged: thus  'more' (< ), but  'daughter'. This tone is realised as high falling in Kohati and the eastern subdialect of Awankari, but as high in the northwestern Awankari subdialect. Like Kohati, the variety of Peshawar has high falling tone before historic voiced aspirates. However, it has also developed a distinct tone on stressed vowels after historic voiced aspirates, like northern Hindko and Punjabi, with a similar loss of aspiration and voicing. But in contrast to Punjabi, this tone is also high falling, and it is distinguished by the accompanying glottalisation:  'daughter',  'congratulations'.

Alphabet  

Hindko is generally written in a variety of the Punjabi alphabet.  It was created by Rehmat Aziz Chitrali at Khowar Academy Chitral.

Literature

The Gandhara Hindko Board is a leading organisation that has been active in the preservation and promotion of the Hindko and culture since 1993.  The board was launched in Peshawar in year 1993 to preserve and promote Hindko —the second most spoken of the Khyber Pakhtunkhwa Province of Pakistan.  It brings out four regular publications— Hindkowan, The Gandhara Voice, " Sarkhail" and "Tarey" and a number of occasional publications.  Late professor Zahoor Ahmad Awan of Peshawar city, the author of 61 books and publications, was the founding-chairman of the board.  Now the board is headed by Ejaz Ahmad Qureshi.  The board has published first Hindko dictionary and several other books on a variety of topics.  With head office in Peshawar, the organisation has regional offices in other cities of the province where Hindko is spoken and understood.  The organisation has arranged a number of mega events to raise awareness among the Hindkowans about the importance of their language and culture.  The board seeks respect for and due attention to all the languages spoken in Gandhara.

In 2003 the Gandhara Hindko Board published first a Hindko dictionary which was compiled by a prominent linguists from Abbottabad, Sultan Sakoon. The board published a second more comprehensive Hindko dictionary in 2007 prepared by Elahi Bakhsh Awan of the University of London.  He is the author of Sarzamin e Hindko, and Hindko Sautiyat.  His three booklets on Hindko phonology were published by the University of Peshawar in the late 1970s.

The Idara-e-Faroghe Hindko based in Peshawar is another body that is promoting the Hindko. Riffat Akbar Swati and Aurangzeb Ghaznavi are main people of this organisation.  The Idara has published the first Hindko translation of the Quran by Haider Zaman Haider and the first Ph.D. thesis on Hindko by E.B.A. Awan.  A monthly magazine Faroogh is also published regularly from Peshawar under supervision of Aurangzeb Ghaznavi.  In Karachi Syed Mehboob is working for the promotion of Hindko.  His articles are frequently published in Farogh monthly.  He is  organiser of Hindko Falahi Forum.

Many organisations like Bazm-e-Ilm-o-Fun Abbottabad and Halqa-e-Yaraan Shinkyari are contributing in their own way to the cause of promoting Hindko and literature.  Asif Saqib, Sufi Abdur Rasheed, Fazal-e-Akbar Kamal, Sharif Hussain Shah, Muhammad Farid, Yahya Khalid, Nazir Kasalvi, and Muhammad Hanif have contributed a lot in this regard.  Sultan Sakoon has written the First Hindko dictionary that has been published by Gandhara Hindko Board.  Sultan Sakoon stands out for his literary contribution as he is a prolific writer and his books including those on Hindko proverbs and Hindko riddles have been published.

Poetry example
An excerpt from the Kalām of Ahmad Ali Saayein:

Transliteration: Alif-Awal hai Alam e hast sī o
Hātif āp pukārā Bismillah
Fīr Qalam nū̃ hukum e Nawišt hoyā
Hus ke qalam sir māriyā Bismillah
Naqšā Loh e Mahfūz dai wic sine
Qalam sāf utāriyā Bismillah
Is Tahrīr nū̃ paṛah ke Farištiyā̃ ne
Sāiyā̃ Šukar guzāriyā Bismillah

Translation: "He is the foremost from the world of existence
Voice of the unseen exclaimed Bismillah
The pen was ordered to write
Pen carried out the order to write Bismillah
When angels read this composition
Saaieaan, they showed their thankfulness with Bismillah"

Proverbs
Hindko has a rich heritage of proverbs (Hindko matlaan, sg. matal). An example of a proverb:

Transliteration: Jidur sir udur sarhanra

Translation: "Good person gains respect everywhere."

Notes

References

Bibliography

 

 A detailed study based on the dialect of the city of Peshawar. A version was published in 1994 by Idara Farogh-e-Hindko, Peshawar.

Further reading 
 2004: Hindko Sautiyat, Dr E.B.A. Awan, published by Gandhara Hindko Board Peshawar in 2004.
 2005: Hindko Land - a thesis presented by Dr E.B.A. Awan at the World Hindko Conference at Peshawar in 2005.
 1978: "Rival linguistic identities in Pakistan Punjab." Rule, protest, identity: aspects of modern South Asia (ed. P. Robb & D. Taylor), 213–34. London: Curzon
 Monthly Farogh Peshawar Hindko magazine March 2010.
 Karachi main Hindko zaban o adab Dr.Syed Mehboob ka kirdar " by Kamal Shah
  (based on the Hindko of Peshawar)

External links 

 Gandhara Hindko Board

Greater Punjabi languages and dialects
Punjabi dialects
Languages of Punjab, Pakistan
Languages of Khyber Pakhtunkhwa
Languages of Azad Kashmir
Languages of Jammu and Kashmir
Hindko language
Tonal languages in non-tonal families